The Church of the Holy Trinity is an Episcopal parish church located at 316 East 88th Street between First and Second Avenues in the Yorkville neighborhood of Manhattan, New York City.

History 
The parish was originally located on the northeast corner of Madison Avenue and East 42nd Street in a Victorian cottage ornéé (ornamental cottage) designed by Jacob Wrey Mould. This building was replaced on the site in 1873 by one designed by Leopold Eidlitz in a High Victorian hybrid of the German Romanesque design. This was generally referred to as Dr. Tyng's Church after the "hardworking churchman, the younger Stephen H. Tyng, who organized it in 1874." The church building at that location was rather short-lived: in 1895, the parish merged with St. James', and the building was sold and demolished.

The St. James parish had been given property by Serena Rhinelander on East 88th Street, on what was once the Rhinelander Farm. A mission church was built on this land from 1895 to 1899, designed by Barney and Chapman. It was consecrated on May 6, 1899. Although the mission was administered by St. James, it was called Holy Trinity.  It became its own parish in 1951.  The church complex includes St. Christopher House and a parsonage.

See also 
 Church of the Holy Trinity v. United States

References

External links

 Official website

1874 establishments in New York (state)
1895 disestablishments in New York (state)
19th-century Episcopal church buildings
Churches completed in 1874
Churches in Manhattan
Closed churches in New York City
Demolished buildings and structures in Manhattan
Demolished churches in New York City
Former Episcopal church buildings in New York City
Leopold Eidlitz church buildings
Romanesque Revival church buildings in New York City
Upper East Side
Victorian architecture in New York City